Ben Wilkins is a British re-recording mixer. He has won an Academy Award in the category Best Sound for Whiplash. He has worked on more than 150 films since 1991.

Selected filmography
 Whiplash (2014)
 Desterted (2016)
 Mansfield 66/67 (2017)

References

External links

https://web.archive.org/web/20161105032250/http://www.technicolor.com/en/ben-wilkins 

Year of birth missing (living people)
Living people
British audio engineers
Best Sound Mixing Academy Award winners
Best Sound BAFTA Award winners